Live in Bologna may refer to:

 Live in Bologna (Cecil Taylor album)
 Live in Bologna (Lou Donaldson album)